CG Lux Kamana Film Awards is an award ceremony for Nepali movies organised by Kamana Cine Magazine.

References

External links 

 

Nepali film awards
Annual events in Nepal